Richard Burgin may refer to:
 Richard Burgin (violinist)
 Richard Burgin (writer)